Bothwell Castle Policies Cricket Ground is a cricket ground in Uddingston, Scotland, and is named after the nearby Bothwell Castle.  The first recorded match held on the ground came in 1902 when Uddingston played a friendly against Gloucestershire.  110 years later the ground held its first List A match when Scotland played Glamorgan in the 2012 Clydesdale Bank 40.  A further List A match was held there in that same competition, with Hampshire the visitors.  Bothwell Castle was given these games due to damage caused by vandalism at Mannofield Park in Aberdeen, which was originally to host the two matches.

The ground is still used by Uddingston Cricket Club, where the first team lose regularly, whilst the second team are undefeated in a long time.

References

External links
Bothwell Castle Cricket Ground at ESPNcricinfo
Bothwell Castle Cricket Ground at CricketArchive

Cricket grounds in Scotland
Sports venues in South Lanarkshire
Buildings and structures in South Lanarkshire
1902 establishments in Scotland
Bothwell and Uddingston
Sports venues completed in 1902